Red Snow is a 2019 Canadian war drama film, written and directed by Marie Clements and produced by Marie Clements, Lael McCall, and Michelle Morris. The film stars Asivak Koostachin as Dylan Nadazeau, a Gwich'in soldier serving in the Canadian Army during the War in Afghanistan, who is captured by the Taliban.

The film's cast also includes Tantoo Cardinal, Samuel Marty, Michelle Thrush, Tarun Keram, Mozhdah Jamalzadah, Steven Cree Molison and Leela Gilday. The film was shot in 2018 in various locations in the Northwest Territories and British Columbia, including Yellowknife, Dettah, Kamloops, Whistler and Cache Creek. It includes dialogue in Gwich'in, Inuvialuktun, Pashto and English.

The film premiered at the 2019 Vancouver International Film Festival, where it won the Audience Award for Most Popular Canadian Film. It subsequently won the award for Best Canadian Feature at the Edmonton International Film Festival.

References

External links
 

2019 films
Canadian war drama films
Films directed by Marie Clements
Films shot in British Columbia
Films shot in the Northwest Territories
Films set in Afghanistan
War in Afghanistan (2001–2021) films
2019 war drama films
Pashto-language films
English-language Canadian films
2019 drama films
2010s Canadian films
2019 multilingual films
Canadian multilingual films